Neftalí Soto Santiago is a farmer, attorney and former Secretary of Agriculture of Puerto Rico. 

Soto is from Lares, Puerto Rico who has served as Secretary of the Puerto Rico Department of Agriculture under two governors, Pedro Rosselló from 1993 to 1997 and Luis Fortuño from 2012 to 2013.  During his most recent stint, he succeeded Javier Rivera Aquino, also a native of Lares, who served for over 3 years since 2009.

As a farmer, Soto specialized in growing coffee. His traditional coffee hacienda in Lares became the base for the "Alto Grande" brand when he sold the property in 1990.

Soto unsuccessfully ran for the office of president of the Puerto Rico Bar Association.

References

Year of birth missing (living people)
Living people
Members of the 15th Cabinet of Puerto Rico
People from Lares, Puerto Rico
Puerto Rican farmers
Puerto Rican lawyers
Secretaries of Agriculture of Puerto Rico